This is a list of international trade topics.

 Absolute advantage
 Agreement on Trade-Related Aspects of Intellectual Property Rights (TRIPS)
 Asia-Pacific Economic Cooperation (APEC)
 Autarky
 Balance of trade
 Barter
 Bilateral Investment Treaty (BIT)
 Bimetallism
 Branch plant economy
 Bretton Woods conference
 Bretton Woods system
 British timber trade
 Cash crop
 Central European Free Trade Agreement (CEFTA)
 Comparative advantage
 Cost, Insurance and Freight (CIF)
 Council of Arab Economic Unity
 Currency
 Customs broking
 Customs union
 David Ricardo
 Doha Development Round (Of World Trade Organization)
 Dominican Republic – Central America Free Trade Agreement (DR-CAFTA)
 Enabling clause
 Enhanced Integrated Framework for Trade-Related Assistance for the Least Developed Countries
 European Union (EU)
 Export documents
 ATA Carnet
 ATR.1 certificate
 Certificate of origin
 EUR.1 movement certificate
 Form A
 Form B
 TIR Carnet
 European Free Trade Association (EFTA)
 Exchange rate
 Factor price equalization
 Fair trade
 Foreign direct investment (FDI)
 Foreign exchange option
 Foreign Sales Corporations (FSCs)
 Forfaiting
 Free Trade Area of the Americas (FTAA)
 Free On Board (FOB)
 Free trade
 Free trade area
 Free trade zone (FTZ)
 General Agreement on Tariffs and Trade (GATT)
 Generalized System of Preferences (GSP)
 Genetically modified food controversies
 Geographical pricing
 Giant sucking sound (a colorful phrase by Ross Perot)
 Global financial system (GFS)
 Globalization
 Gold standard
 Gravity model of trade
 Gresham's law
 Heckscher-Ohlin model (H-O model)
 Horizontal integration
 Import
 Import substitution industrialization (ISI)
 International Chamber of Commerce (ICC)
 International factor movements
 International law
 International Monetary Market (IMM)
 International Monetary Fund (IMF)
 International Trade Organization (ITO)
 Internationalization
 Internationalization and localization (G11n)
 ISO 4217 (international standard for currency codes)
 Leontief paradox
 Linder hypothesis
 List of tariffs and trade legislation
 Maquiladora
 Mercantilism
 Merchant bank
 Money market
 Most favoured nation (MFN)
 Nearshoring
 New Trade Theory (NTT)
 North American Free Trade Agreement (NAFTA)
 Offshore outsourcing
 Offshoring
 Organisation for Economic Co-operation and Development (OECD)
 Organization of the Petroleum Exporting Countries (OPEC)
 Outsourcing
 Purchasing power parity (PPP)
 Rules of origin
 Safeguard
 South Asia Free Trade Agreement (SAFTA)
 Special drawing rights (SDRs)
 Special Economic Zone (SEZ)
 Tariff
 Tax, tariff and trade
 Terms of trade (TOT)
 Tobin tax
 Trade
 Trade barrier
 Trade bloc
 Trade facilitation
 Trade Facilitation and Development
 Trade finance
 Trade pact
 Trade sanctions
 Trade war
 Transfer pricing
 Transfer problem
 United Nations Monetary and Financial Conference
 Uruguay Round (Of General Agreement on Tariffs and Trade)
 Wage insurance
 World Intellectual Property Organization (WIPO)
 World Intellectual Property Organization Copyright Treaty (WIPO Copyright Treaty)
 World Trade Organization (WTO)

See also 
 Outline of business management
 Outline of economics
 Outline of finance
 Outline of marketing
 Outline of production
 Index of accounting articles
 List of business law topics
 List of business theorists
 List of economists

 index
International trade topics
International trade
International trade